The phrase "on the bubble" is sports terminology for being on the cusp of something; this could range from a team that is just on the cusp of being in the postseason or postseason conversation (also known as bubble teams), or a player who is considered almost good enough to make a roster (bubble player).

NCAA Men's and Women's Division I Basketball Championship
"On the bubble" is most popular when talking about the Men's and Women's end of the season tournament.  When it comes down to Selection Sunday at the end of the season there are about five to six teams that are on the bubble of getting in the tournament each and every season. When a team is on the bubble, and they do get into the tournament they are most commonly placed as the 11th seed and will often play another team that was on the bubble in the first game of the tournament as a Play-in game. If a team that is considered to be on the bubble they are almost always one of the top seeds in the National Invitation Tournament which consists of all the teams that just were not quite good enough to be in the NCAA Tournament.

How to be on the bubble
To be considered on the bubble, there are several different things that have to play out during the season. Firstly, a player must have to have a respectable record. Each year, when deciding between the five or six bubble teams, the Selection Committee primarily considers strength of schedule, top 50 wins, and top 100 wins. What hurts "bubble teams" trying to get into the tournament is a bad loss to a team that is below 150. Each year there is at least one or two bubble teams that do not make it into the NCAA tournament, as expected by college basketball analysts. During the tournament it is very rare to see bubble teams make a deep run in the tournament, but there have been a few Cinderella teams.

Recent notable bubble teams
Almost every season there are two or three really big Upsets, with at least one of them coming from a team that was considered to be on the Bubble. Listed below are many of the teams that were listed on the bubble, but made a run in the NCAA Tournament.
 Syracuse (2016 NCAA Tournament) Made the 2016 Final Four (college basketball)
 Virginia Commonwealth University (2011 NCAA Tournament) Made the 2011 Final Four
2006 george mason 
Many bubble teams have done some damage in the tournament, but have not quite been able to win the National Championship yet.

On the roster bubble
The roster bubble deals with rosters from numerous leagues, such as Major League Baseball (MLB), National Football League (NFL), National Basketball Association (NBA), and National Hockey League (NHL). Each of these leagues have a certain number of players that are allowed on the roster, which means there are always a few players that do not make the cut. From the four leagues listed above, the one that is talked about the most for being difficult to make the roster is Major League Baseball.

MLB roster bubble
MLB has by far the largest number of people that are considered to be on the roster bubble. Each baseball roster can have a maximum of twenty-five players being distributed to nine different positions. There is such a large number of players on the bubble for MLB, because there are so many players on each baseball team. The majority of players on the bubble are in the minor leagues. Coaches use spring training to figure out which twenty-five players will make the roster. Players that are on the bubble may start the season in Minor League Baseball in hopes of making the MLB team in the future.

NFL roster bubble
The NFL has a few players that are considered to be on the bubble, but not as many as other professional sports. The reason for this is because each NFL roster consists of fifty-three players, which makes the coaches' decision often fairly easy. If bubble players do not make the roster, they will oftentimes be signed to the team's practice squad or may be picked up by a different NFL team if they are talented enough.

NBA roster bubble
The NBA has by far the fewest people that are considered to be on the bubble; this is because each team only has thirteen players on the roster. Most players that are on the roster bubble will make the NBA team because there are so few players that are actually in the league. The last few men that make the team typically do not get any playing time unless the game is out of hand. If a bubble player does not make the team, they may be sent down to the G League in hopes of one day being called up to the professional level.

NHL roster bubble
The NHL has anywhere from zero to three or four players that are considered to be on the roster bubble in the fall training camp every year. One NHL roster consists of twenty players that are eighteen skaters and two goaltenders. If bubble players do not make the team, they may start out in the American Hockey League, which is similar to the minor leagues in baseball. Hockey has a little bit bigger of a roster compared to other professional sports, which makes it hard to have so many players on the bubble.

References

External links
On the bubble criteria

Sports terminology